.irish is a generic top-level domain (gTLD). The rights to run the domain were applied for in June 2012 by Dot-Irish LLC, a for-profit company in California, United States, as part of an expansion of generic top-level domains by ICANN. The application was successful, and the domain opened for registrations on 17 March 2015, with public registration opened on 25 June 2015.

See also
 .ie
 .cymru
 .scot

References

External links
 

Computer-related introductions in 2015
Irish diaspora
Top-level domains